Sinmu of Silla (r. 839, died 839) (born Ujing) was the 45th monarch of the Korean kingdom of Silla.  His reign was the briefest in the state's history, lasting only from the fourth to the seventh lunar month of 839.

Sinmu was the son of the Sangdaedeung Kim Gyunjeong (?–836), a descendant of King Wonseong (r. 785–798) and cousin to King Heungdok (r. 826–838). Upon the death of King Heungdok in 836 a succession struggle erupted between Kim Gyunjeong and his nephew, Kim Jeryung (?–838). Ujing and his follower, Kim Yang supported Gyunjeong, while  Kim Myeong and Kim Rihong stood by Jeryung. Jeryung's party ultimately triumphed and Gyunjeong was killed. Kim Jeryung was then crowned as King Huigang in 836.

Yang escaped, but Ujing did not. Though being pardoned promptly by the new king, he soon became threatened by Myeong who became Sangdaedeung. So in 837, Ujing fled and entrusted himself with Jang Bogo in Cheonghaejin. However, a year later, Myeong fomented a revolt against King Huigang which killed several of the King's aides. Faced with defeat, King Huigang committed suicide. Kim Myeong then ascended the throne as King Minae. Kim Yang, who was then concealing himself on a mountain near the capital, heard the news and raised up an army to go to Cheonghaejin. He told Ujing of these events and persuaded him to have his revenge. Ujing asked Jang Bogo to help him to take advantage of the confusion of the country and to make himself a king. Jang Bogo agreed and had his friend Jeong Nyeon also follow Ujing. In 839, Ujing and his followers defeated King Minae's army at the battle of Daegu and quickly advanced upon the capital. All the king's aides then ran away leaving the king behind, so the king hid himself in a villa near the royal palace. Soldiers came into the palace and searched for the king. Finally, they found the king in the villa and killed him in spite of his pleas. Kim Rihong was also killed. Ujing then placed himself on the throne as King Sinmu.

He died three months later from disease and was buried on Mt. Jehyeong in the Silla capital of Gyeongju.
It is also said that Sinmu dreamed of seeing the dead Rihong shooting an arrow into him. Sinmu awoke with a start when the arrow hit him, but the wound remained real, becoming worse and worse, finally leading to  his death.

Family 
Parents
 Father: Prince Kim Gyun-jung (김균정), posthumously named King Chujong (추존 국왕)
Grandfather: Prince Hyechung (혜충태자) (750–791/792)
 Grandmother: Queen Seongmok, of the Kim clan ( 성목태후 김씨)
 Mother: Lady Park, of the Park clan (정교부인 박씨), posthumously named Queen Heonmok (정교부인 박씨)
Consorts and their respective issue:
 Queen Jeonggye (정계부인)
Son: Munseong of Silla (died 857) (문성왕) –was the 46th ruler of the Korean kingdom of Silla

See also
List of Korean monarchs
List of Silla people
Unified Silla

References

Silla rulers
839 deaths
Year of birth unknown
9th-century Korean monarchs
yo momma